The loach goby, Rhyacichthys aspro, is a goby belonging to the family Rhyacichthyidae. It is not fished commercially.

Taxonomy
The loach goby is one of the two species classified under the genus Rhyacichthys in the family Rhyacichthyidae.

Thacker and Hardman's study of the molecular phylogeny of gobies indicates the loach goby is the most primitive member of the Gobioidei.

Description
It has eight dorsal spines, eight or 9 soft dorsal rays, one anal spine, and eight or 9 anal rays. The head is flattened vertically, with a snout and small eyes. The mouth is on the underside and has a fleshy upper lip. The body is laterally compressed toward the slightly forked tail; it has a well-developed lateral line system. The pelvic fins are separate, with enlarged musculature. In colour, it is light brown, with darker, longitudinal stripes on its flanks. Also, dark stripes occur on the dorsal, caudal, and pectoral fins.

Distribution and habitat
The loach goby lives in tropical waters between 24°N and 13°S, ranging from China and south Japan, through the Philippines and Indonesia, to New Guinea and the Solomons. It inhabits fast-flowing streams in mountainous terrain.

Habits
The loach goby normally clings to rocks in fast-flowing streams, using the rocks as hiding places when threatened. It makes swift darting movements. It eats the algae growing on the rock surfaces.

References

External links
 Fishbase

Rhyacichthyidae
Fish described in 1837